Bodavarapu Sudhakar (born 25 July 1991) is an Indian first-class cricketer who plays for Andhra Pradesh.

References

External links
 

1991 births
Living people
Indian cricketers
Andhra cricketers
Cricketers from Guntur